Tao Jin (born 2 June 1985) is a Chinese football player.

Club career 
Tao Jin started his professional football career in 2006 with Shanghai Shenhua after graduating from their youth team. He would have to wait until the 2008 league season before he would make his senior debut against Hangzhou Greentown F.C. on August 30, 2008 in a 1-1 draw, league game. Despite his limited playing time with Shanghai he was still included in Shanghai's 2009 AFC Champions League squad and under Jia Xiuquan as the new team manager would start to establish himself within the team's defence throughout the season. Shanghai Shenhua announced Tao's departure on 14 February 2019 when his contract expired.

Career statistics 
Statistics accurate as of match played 31 December 2018

Honours

Club
Shanghai Shenhua
Chinese FA Cup: 2017

References

External links
Shanghai Shenhua Player Profile
Player stats at sohu.com

1985 births
Living people
Chinese footballers
Footballers from Shanghai
Shanghai Shenhua F.C. players
Hunan Billows players
Chinese Super League players
China League One players
Association football defenders